Meka Suri is a 2020 Indian Telugu-language drama directed by Trinadh Velisala. Produced by 1725 Studio and Simba Entertainment, the film stars Abhinay Reddy, Syed Sumaya Farahath, Sharath Kumar, Byreddy Naresh, and Sharavan Sai Tadinada. The plot revolves around the character Suri, a butcher popularly known as "Meka," who marries his love, Rani. However, when Rani gets brutally murdered by a group of people, Meka Suri decides to avenge her death with the help of Naxalites. The film premiered through ZEE5 on 31 July 2020.

Meka Suri was followed by a sequel Meka Suri 2 released on 27 November 2020.

Plot 
Suri is a 6'3" (1.93 cm) tall butcher popularly known as "Meka Suri" for his exceptional skill in skinning an entire goat (called Meka in Telugu) within minutes. He is married to a beautiful, local village girl named Rani. The landlord of the village, Appala Naidu, and his friends exploit and murder his beloved wife, turning Meka's life upside-down. Full of rage, he seeks revenge and executes the trio right under the police's nose with the help of Naxals.

Cast 
 Abhinay Reddy as Meka Suri
 Syed Sumaya Farahath as Rani
 Sharath Kumar as Appal Naidu  
 Byreddy Naresh as Veerabhadram
 Sharavan Sai Tadinada as Raghuram

Production 
The film's director Trinadh Velisala said "It's a true story which was narrated by my relatives in Prakasam district some time ago. Taking their version, I started developing a story along with other inputs. I felt disappointed personally when his village landlords ruined butcher Suri's life."

Release 
Meka Suri premiered through ZEE5 on July 31, 2020.

Reception 
The film received mixed reviews.

Neeshita Nyayapati from Times Of India wrote, "After an endless cycle of this for one-and-a-half-hours with nothing else really happening on the screen, it makes you wonder where the story is buried."

123 Telugu stated, "The main lead, Abhinay, is a good find. He does a good job in his mass role and impresses throughout. Be it his look, body language, or mass dialogues; the young actor did well. Heroine Sumaya also suited her role well and did justice to it. Her natural look and the way her role is written looks good. The film is quite realistic and raw, and credit should be given to the director for keeping an intense atmosphere in the film."

References

External links 
 
 Meka Suri on ZEE5

2020 films
2020 drama films
Indian drama films
2020s Telugu-language films
Films not released in theaters due to the COVID-19 pandemic
ZEE5 original films
2020 direct-to-video films